Old English phonology is necessarily somewhat speculative since Old English is preserved only as a written language. Nevertheless, there is a very large corpus of the language, and the orthography apparently indicates phonological alternations quite faithfully, so it is not difficult to draw certain conclusions about the nature of Old English phonology.

Old English had a distinction between short and long (doubled) consonants, at least between vowels (as seen in  "sun" and  "son",  "to put" and  "to steal"), and a distinction between short vowels and long vowels in stressed syllables. It had a larger number of vowel qualities in stressed syllables –  and in some dialects  – than in unstressed ones – .

Phonology

Consonants 

The inventory of consonant surface sounds (whether allophones or phonemes) of Old English is as shown below. Allophones are enclosed in parentheses.

Intervocalic voicing 
The fricatives  had voiced allophones , which occurred between vowels or a vowel and a voiced consonant when the preceding sound was stressed.
  ('letter') : 
  ('letters')  > 
  ('blacksmith') : 
  ('blacksmiths')  > 
  ('house' noun) : 
  ('to house')  > 
  ('forth') :  
 compare  ('earth')  > 
  ('fathom')  > 

Proto-Germanic  (a fricative allophone of ) developed into the OE stop , but Proto-Germanic  (a fricative allophone of ) developed into the OE fricative  (either its voiced allophone  or its voiceless allophone [f]).
 PG   > OE  
 PG   > OE stæf 

Dorsal consonants 

Old English had a fairly large set of dorsal (postalveolar, palatal, velar) and glottal consonants: .

(Although this palatalization occurred as a regular sound change, later vowel changes and borrowings meant that the occurrence of the palatal forms was no longer predictable, that is, the palatals and the velars had become separate phonemes.)

In modern texts, the palatalized versions may be written with a dot above the letter: , . Note that Old English had palatalized  in certain words that have hard G in Modern English due to Old Norse influence, such as  "give" and  "gate".)

The voiced velar fricative  was pronounced as the stop  after  or when doubled.
  ('day') 
  
  
  ('dawn') 
 ,  ('castle')  > 
  
  
  ('to sing')  >  (from )
  ('bridge')  >  (from  < )

 are allophones of  occurring word-initially and after a front vowel respectively.
  ('dog')  > 
  ('boy')  > 

The evidence for the allophone  after front vowels is indirect, as it is not indicated in the orthography. Moreover, in late Middle English,  sometimes became  (e.g. tough, cough), but only after back vowels, never after front vowels. This is explained if we assume that the allophone  sometimes became  but the allophone  never did.

Sonorants 
Words that have final  in standard Modern English have the cluster  in Old English.
  ('sink')  > 
  ('ring')  > 

The exact nature of Old English  is not known. It may have been an alveolar approximant , as in most Modern English accents, an alveolar flap , or an alveolar trill .

 were pronounced as voiceless sonorants  following .
   ('what')
   ('bread') (Modern English )
   ('nut')
   ('ring')

However, it is also commonly theorized that the ⟨h⟩ in these sequences was unpronounced, and only stood for the voicelessness of the following sonorant.

Velarization 
This is suggested by the vowel shifts of breaking and retraction before , which could be cases of assimilation to a following velar consonant:
  >  >   ('learn')
  >  >  
  >   ('to fall')
Due to phonotactic constraints on initial clusters, ⟨wr⟩ and ⟨wl⟩ are thought by some to be digraphs representing these velarized sounds, in which case the distinction was phonemic:
 :  "to grow"
 :  "to ride"
 :  "to look"
 :  "to bend"

Vowels 
Old English had a moderately large vowel system. In stressed syllables, both monophthongs and diphthongs had short and long versions, which were clearly distinguished in pronunciation. In unstressed syllables, vowels were reduced or elided, though not as much as in Modern English.

Monophthongs 
Old English had seven or eight vowel qualities, depending on dialect, and each could appear  as either a long or short monophthong.

The front mid rounded vowel  occurs in the Anglian dialects, for instance, but merged into  in the West Saxon dialect.

The long–short vowel pair  developed into the Middle English vowels , with two different vowel qualities distinguished by height, so they may have had different qualities in Old English as well.

In unstressed syllables, only three vowels, were distinguished.

Diphthongs 
All dialects of Old English had diphthongs. Like monophthongs, diphthongs appear to have had short and long versions. In modern texts, long diphthongs are marked with a macron on the first letter. The short versions behave like short monophthongs, and the long versions like long monophthongs. Most Old English diphthongs consist of a front vowel followed by a back offglide; according to some analyses they were in fact front vowels followed by a velarized consonant. The diphthongs tend to be height-harmonic, meaning that both parts of the diphthong had the same vowel height (high, mid or low).

The Anglian dialects had the following diphthongs:

They were apparently monophothongized by Alfred the Great's time, to a vowel whose pronunciation is still uncertain, but is known as "unstable i". (According to another interpretation, however, the "unstable i" may simply have been , and the later  can be explained by the fact that Late West Saxon was not a direct descendant of Early West Saxon. See Old English dialects.) 'much' from earlier , with rounding perhaps triggered by the rounded ).

Origin of diphthongs 

Old English diphthongs have several origins, either from Proto-Germanic or from Old English vowel shifts. Long diphthongs developed partly from the Proto-Germanic diphthongs  and partly from the Old English vowel shifts, while the short diphthongs developed only from Old English vowel shifts. These are examples of diphthongs inherited from Proto-Germanic:
 PG  > Anglian , West Saxon  '[I] am'
 PG  > OE  'animal' > Modern English deer
 PG  > OE  'death'

There are three vowel shifts that resulted in diphthongs: breaking, palatal diphthongization, and back mutation.
 PG  > Anglo-Frisian  > Anglian , West Saxon leornian 'learn' (breaking)
 PG  > AF  > Old English  'near' (breaking)
 PG  > AF  >  'give' (palatal diphthongization)
 PG  > AF  > OE  'seven' (back mutation)

Scholars disagree on whether short diphthongs are phonologically possible, and some say that Old English short diphthongs must actually have been centralized vowels. Hogg argues against this, saying that a length contrast in diphthongs exists in modern languages, such as Scots, in which the short diphthong in tide  contrasts with the long diphthong in tied .

Peter Schrijver has theorized that Old English breaking developed from language contact with Celtic. He says that two Celtic languages were spoken in Britain, Highland British Celtic, which was phonologically influenced by British Latin and developed into Welsh, Cornish, and Breton, and Lowland British Celtic, which was brought to Ireland at the time of the Roman conquest of Britain and became Old Irish. Lowland British Celtic had velarization like Old and Modern Irish, which gives preceding vowels a back offglide, and this feature was loaned by language contact into Old English, resulting in backing diphthongs.

Phonotactics
Phonotactics is the study of the sequences of phonemes that occur in languages and the sound structures that they form. In this study it is usual to represent consonants in general with the letter C and vowels with the letter V, so that a syllable such as 'be' is described as having CV structure. The IPA symbol used to show a division between syllables is the dot .  Old English stressed syllables were structured as (C)3V(C)3.

Onset
Onset clusters typically consist of a fricative  and a stop , although  is allowed as a third element before voiceless stops. The other onset consonants  (and  if these are accepted as existing) always occur alone.

Nucleus
The syllable nucleus was always a vowel.

Coda

Sound changes 

It also underwent vowel shifts that were not shared with Old Frisian: smoothing, diphthong height harmonization, and breaking.

Palatalization yielded some Modern English word-pairs in which one word has a velar and the other has a palatal or postalveolar. Some of these were inherited from Old English (drink and drench, day and dawn), while others have an unpalatalized form loaned from Old Norse ( and ).

Dialects 

Old English had four major dialect groups: Kentish, West Saxon, Mercian, and Northumbrian. Kentish and West Saxon were the dialects spoken south of a line approximately following the course of the River Thames: Kentish in the easternmost portion of that area and West Saxon everywhere else. Mercian was spoken in the middle part of the country, separated from the southern dialects by the Thames and from Northumbrian by the River Humber. Mercian and Northumbrian are often grouped together as "Anglian".

The biggest differences occurred between West Saxon and the other groups.  The differences occurred mostly in the front vowels, and particularly the diphthongs. (However, Northumbrian was distinguished from the rest by much less palatalization.  Forms in Modern English with hard  and  where a palatalized sound would be expected from Old English are due either to Northumbrian influence or to direct borrowing from Scandinavian.  Note that, in fact, the lack of palatalization in Northumbrian was probably due to heavy Scandinavian influence.)

The further discussion concerns the differences between Anglian and West Saxon, with the understanding that Kentish, other than where noted, can be derived from Anglian by front-vowel merger. The primary differences were:
Hence, e.g.,  ('to divide') <  appears the same in both dialects, but West Saxon  ('to sleep') appears as slēpan in Anglian. (Note the corresponding vowel difference in the spelling of "deal" <  vs. "sleep" < Anglian .)
Hence, Anglian  ('cold') vs. West Saxon .
This accounts for some of the most noticeable differences between standard (i.e. West Saxon) Old English and Modern English spelling. E.g.

Modern English derives mostly from the Anglian dialect rather than the standard West Saxon dialect of Old English.  However, since London sits on the Thames near the boundary of the Anglian, West Saxon, and Kentish dialects, some West Saxon and Kentish forms have entered Modern English.  For example, bury has its spelling derived from West Saxon and its pronunciation from Kentish (see below).

Examples 
The prologue to Beowulf:

The Lord's Prayer:

Notes

References

External links 

English phonology
Phonology